The Canton of Saint-Martin-d'Auxigny is a canton situated in the Cher département and in the Centre-Val de Loire region of France.

Geography 
An area of winegrowing, farming and forestry in the northern part of the arrondissement of Bourges centred on the town of Saint-Martin-d'Auxigny. The altitude varies from 133m at Fussy to 312m at Menetou-Salon, with an average altitude of 183m.

Composition 
At the French canton reorganisation which came into effect in March 2015, the canton was expanded from 11 to 15 communes:
 
Achères
Allogny
Fussy
Menetou-Salon
Pigny
Quantilly
Saint-Éloy-de-Gy
Saint-Georges-sur-Moulon
Saint-Laurent
Saint-Martin-d'Auxigny
Saint-Palais
Vasselay
Vignoux-sous-les-Aix  
Vignoux-sur-Barangeon
Vouzeron

Population

See also 
 Arrondissements of the Cher department
 Cantons of the Cher department
 Communes of the Cher department

References

Saint-Martin-d'Auxigny